Boudenaya is one of 28 parishes (administrative divisions) in Salas, a municipality within the province and autonomous community of Asturias, in northern Spain.

Villages
 Boudenaya
 Brañamiana
 El Castru
 El Couz
 La Cuerva
 Porciles

References

Parishes in Salas